Homo consumericus (mock Latin for consumerist person) is a neologism used in the social sciences, notably by Gad Saad in his book The Evolutionary Bases of Consumption and by Gilles Lipovetsky in Le Bonheur Paradoxal. According to these and other scholars the phenomenon of mass consumption could be compared to certain traits of human psychology described by evolutionary scientists pointing out similarities between Darwinian principles and consumer behaviour. Lipovetsky has noted that modern times have brought about the rise of a third type of Homo consumericus, who is unpredictable and insatiable.

A similar expression "Homo Consumens" was used by Erich Fromm in Socialist Humanism, written in 1965. There Fromm wrote on Homo consumens: "Homo consumens is the man whose main goal is not primarily to own things, but to consume more and more, and thus to compensate for his inner vacuity, passivity, loneliness, and anxiety."

The expression "Homo Consumens" was used by several other authors, including Mihailo Marković.

See also 

Anti-consumerism
Commodity fetishism
Consumerism
Cultural studies
Gilles Lipovetsky

References

External links 
Psychology Today – Homo Consumericus
Homo Consumericus – Evolution & Consumption
Julien Winock – Le bonheur paradoxal. Essai sur la société d’hyperconsommation – Gilles Lipovetsky

Evolutionary biology
Selection
Social philosophy
Consumer
Dog Latin words and phrases